Anne Le Guernec  is a French actress and director, known to English-speaking audiences for her appearance in George R.R. Martin's Doorways.

Early life
Le Guernec was born in  Suresnes, France. She developed an interest in acting in High School, and studied under Madeleine Marion and performed in The Cherry Orchard by Anton Chekhov and in The Lady from the Sea by Henrik Ibsen. She did a degree in Theatre Studies at Théâtre du Lycée Renoir.

Career
Soon after graduation she started to work in films and television, including roles in Charlotte for Ever and Les Enfants du marais. Her first American production was the pilot for George R.R. Martin's Doorways. She has also consistently worked in theatre, both acting and directing, including performances in works by Molière, Marina Carr, John Millington Synge, Albert Camus, Jean-Paul Sartre, and Martin Crimp.

Filmography

Film
 1986 : Charlotte for Ever
 1998 : Les Enfants du marais
 2000 : Cet amour-là
 2006 : Danse avec lui
 2009 : La Tête en friche

Dubbing
 2012 : Foxfire 
 2012 : Anna Karénine 
 2012 : My Week with Marilyn

Television
 1990 : Intrigues (TF1) (in 3 episodes)
 1992 : Doorways
 1992 : Extrême Limite (episode: Le Vol d'Icare)
 1999 : Mary Lester
 2001 : L'Instit (episode: La Main dans la main)
 2002 : Navarro (episode: Voleur sans défense)
 2007 : Avocats et Associés (episode: Eau trouble)
 2013 : Vogue la vie (episode: Corinne)

References

External links
 
 Official site
 Anne Le Guernec Official Website

Living people
French film actresses
French women singers
20th-century French actresses
21st-century French actresses
Year of birth missing (living people)